Papanasini  is the mountain stream in wayanad district of kerala.

Emanating from the heart of Brahmagiri forest flowing through roots, leaves and flowers of ancient trees and medicinal herbs, Papanasini is a holy mountain stream accessible around 1 km northwest of the temple premises. Pilgrims bathe here as they consider its waters to be sacred with powers to absolve one's sins. Further, the temple offers services to immerse cremation ashes in the sacred mountain stream to be thus carried to Kaveri River and from there to the ocean. This is a part of the last rites.

Rajiv Gandhi 's ashes are immersed here.

According to Thirunelli temple officials, if the ashes of the dead are immersed in Papanasini, it is equivalent to doing the rituals in Gaya.

Geography
The river begins as a spring in the Brahmagiri Hills region near Tirunelli Temple.  The river meets the Kalindi River of Kerala (not the more famous Kalindi which is also known as Yamuna).

Legends
According to tradition, Vishnu granted the power of the Papanasini river to wash away all sins as a boon to Lord Brahma, after Lord Brahma installed an idol of Vishnu at Thirunelli Temple.  Pilgrims travel to Papansini river on karkidaka vavu to wash themselves of their sins.

See also
 Appapara
 Thirunelly
 Palvelicham
 Valliyoorkkavu

References 

Rivers of Wayanad district
Mananthavady Area